The 1993–94 NBA season was the Mavericks' 14th season in the National Basketball Association. After a dreadful season where they only won just eleven games, the Mavericks selected Jamal Mashburn from the University of Kentucky with the fourth overall pick in the 1993 NBA draft. Despite the addition of Mashburn, and second-year star Jim Jackson playing in his first full season, the Mavericks' misery continued under new head coach Quinn Buckner, losing 23 of their first 24 games, including a 20-game losing streak between November and December, which tied the infamous 1972–73 Philadelphia 76ers. The record was later on broken by the 1995–96 Vancouver Grizzlies and the 1997–98 Denver Nuggets, where both teams lost 23 consecutive games, which was then later broken by the 2010–11 Cleveland Cavaliers and the 2013–14 Philadelphia 76ers, who lost 26 consecutive games. The Mavericks then suffered a 16-game losing streak (which led to a 2–39 record) on their way to a miserable 3–40 record at the end of January.

At midseason, the team traded Derek Harper to the New York Knicks in exchange for Tony Campbell to replace Knicks point guard Doc Rivers (who played only 19 games due to a knee injury and missed the rest of the season), and signed free agent Lorenzo Williams. The Mavericks held a 6–42 record at the All-Star break, and continued to struggle posting a 17-game losing streak between March and April, but would post a 5–8 record in April. They won their final two games finishing last place in the Midwest Division with a miserable record of 13–69, narrowly missing out on back-to-back 70-loss seasons.

Mashburn and Jackson both led the Mavericks in scoring with 19.2 points per game each, with Mashburn being named to the NBA All-Rookie First Team, while second-year center Sean Rooks averaged 11.4 points and 5.5 rebounds per game. In addition, Doug Smith provided with 8.8 points and 4.4 rebounds per game, while Fat Lever contributed 6.9 points and 2.0 steals per game, Tim Legler contributed 8.3 points per game off the bench, and rookie forward Popeye Jones provided with 5.8 points and 7.5 rebounds per game. 

Following the season, Buckner was fired as head coach, while Rooks was traded to the Minnesota Timberwolves, Campbell signed as a free agent with the Cleveland Cavaliers, Legler was released to free agency, and Lever and Randy White both retired.

Offseason

Draft picks

Roster

Regular season

Season standings

z - clinched division title
y - clinched division title
x - clinched playoff spot

Record vs. opponents

Game log

Player statistics

Awards and records
 Jamal Mashburn, NBA All-Rookie Team 1st Team

Transactions

References

See also
 1993-94 NBA season

Dallas Mavericks seasons
Dallas
Dallas
Dallas